Loris Bacchetti (born 6 February 1993) is an Italian footballer who plays as a defender for Feralpisalò.

Club career
Born in Guardiagrele, Abruzzo, Bacchetti started his career at Abruzzo team Pescara. In January 2010, he was exchanged for Danilo Soddimo. 50% registration rights of Bacchetti was valued €300,000 and the 50% rights of Soddimo also valued €300,000. Bacchetti returned to Pescara along with Bruno Martella in summer 2011. Bacchetti played three times in 2011–12 Serie B. In June 2012 Sampdoria acquired Martella outright and sold Bacchetti back to Pescara. On 16 July 2012, he joined Serie B club Virtus Lanciano on a loan deal.

On 3 January 2013 he was signed by Catanzaro. The loan was renewed on 12 July 2013.

On 29 January 2019, he joined Cavese on loan.

On 26 June 2019, Bacchetti signed with Gubbio.

On 28 July 2020 Bacchetti signed a 3-year contract with Feralpisalò.

International career
Bacchetti was a youth international for Italy U20.

References

External links
 
 
 

1993 births
Living people
Sportspeople from the Province of Chieti
Italian footballers
Association football defenders
Serie B players
Serie C players
Delfino Pescara 1936 players
S.S. Virtus Lanciano 1924 players
U.S. Catanzaro 1929 players
S.S. Juve Stabia players
U.S. Ancona 1905 players
Catania S.S.D. players
S.S. Monopoli 1966 players
F.C. Pro Vercelli 1892 players
Cavese 1919 players
A.S. Gubbio 1910 players
FeralpiSalò players
Italy youth international footballers
Footballers from Abruzzo